Hlušice is a municipality and village in Hradec Králové District in the Hradec Králové Region of the Czech Republic. It has about 700 inhabitants.

Administrative parts
The village of Hlušičky is an administrative part of Hlušice.

Notable people
Ladislav Vízek (born 1955), footballer; raised here

References

External links

Villages in Hradec Králové District